Pacific Reef is a coral reef located within the Florida Keys National Marine Sanctuary and also within Biscayne National Park.  Unlike many reefs within the National Marine Sanctuary, this reef is not within a Sanctuary Preservation Area (SPA). It is south of Ajax Reef.

The Pacific Reef Light is still operational at Pacific Reef.

References
 NOAA National Marine Sanctuary Maps, Florida Keys East
 NOAA Navigational Chart 11463

Coral reefs of the Florida Keys